The NWA Pacific Northwest Heavyweight Championship was a professional wrestling championship sanctioned by the National Wrestling Alliance and defended in its member promotion Pacific Northwest Wrestling, which promoted shows in the U.S. states of Oregon and Washington, and occasionally other areas in the northwestern United States.

The title was created in 1955 by Don Owen Sports for the NWA Pacific Northwest territory, and became the top singles title for that area.  The first champion was Ed Francis, who was already the territory's top singles champion, holding the Pacific Coast Junior Heavyweight Championship. Upon Francis taking on the NWA PNW Heavyweight Championship, his Pacific Coast Junior Heavyweight Championship was retired. The title was also briefly defended in the Japanese promotion Wrestling International New Generations (W*ING) in 1992, but the title changes in W*ING were not officially recognized by PNW.

The title remained active until July 1992, when Don Owen retired and sold his company to Sandy Barr.  Barr retired all NWA PNW titles with Owen and began operating under the company name "Championship Wrestling USA", creating new championships. The actual retired (Owen Era) NWA Pacific Northwest Heavyweight Championship belt was auctioned off by Len Denton (The Grappler) to Bruce Owens. Dave Millican (The Ace of Belts) purchased it from Owens and later sold it to a collector who wishes to remain anonymous.

Elite Canadian Championship Wrestling (formerly NWA/Extreme Canadian Championship Wrestling) became recognized as the NWA Pacific Northwest territory in 1998 and have an ECCW Championship, which is sometimes referred to as the NWA Pacific Northwest Heavyweight Championship. In January  2015, the NWA made its return to Portland when local promotion Blue Collar Wrestling (BCW) joined the Alliance.

Title history

Original version
This version was promoted by Pacific Northwest Wrestling (PNW).

See also
Pacific Northwest Wrestling
Elite Canadian Championship Wrestling
National Wrestling Alliance

References

Pacific Northwest Wrestling championships
National Wrestling Alliance championships
Heavyweight wrestling championships
National Wrestling Alliance state wrestling championships
Regional professional wrestling championships